Sečanj is a town located in the Central Banat District of the autonomous province of Vojvodina, Serbia. The town itself has a population of 2,373, while the Sečanj municipality has 13,267 inhabitants.

Name
"Sečanj" is a Slavic name for the first month in the calendar year. The Serbian Ekavian variant of this name was eventually replaced with the Latin-derived "Januar", while the Croatian Ijekavian variant "Siječanj" remains in use in Croatia.

In Serbian and Croatian, the town is known as Sečanj (Сечањ), in Hungarian as Szécsány or Torontálszécsány, in German as Setschan or Petersheim, and in Romanian as Seceani.

Serbian, Hungarian, and Romanian language are officially used by municipal authorities.

Demographics

According to the 2011 census, the population of the municipality of Sečanj was 13,267 inhabitants.

Ethnic composition
The settlements with Serb ethnic majority are: Sečanj, Banatska Dubica, Boka, Jarkovac, Jaša Tomić, Krajišnik, and Sutjeska. The settlement with Hungarian ethnic majority is Busenje. Ethnically mixed settlements with relative Serb majority are: Konak, Neuzina and Šurjan.

Inhabited places

The Sečanj municipality includes also the following villages:
 Jaša Tomić
 Banatska Dubica
 Boka
 Busenje
 Jarkovac
 Konak 
 Krajišnik
 Neuzina 
 Sutjeska 
 Šurjan

Twin towns – sister cities
 Azov, Russia (2018)

See also
 List of cities in Serbia
 List of cities, towns and villages in Vojvodina

References

External links

 
Populated places in Serbian Banat
Municipalities and cities of Vojvodina
Central Banat District